Something Remote is a 2009 American independent comedy film written and directed by Alex Laferriere, and produced by Nick Allain and Steve DiTullio. Starring C/J Haley, Rick Desilets, and John Selig, it follows three overeducated, TV-addicted roommates trying to stay together as an ex-girlfriend tries to tear them apart. Something Remote was the first feature-length film by Broken Wall Films.

Filmed in Laferriere's apartment on a $150 budget, Something Remote was awarded "Best Feature" and "Funniest Flick" at the Silk City Flick Fest in 2009. Something Remote was also shown at Gen Con Indy 2010 and the 2010 Wanderings Film Festival.

The film spawned a web series of the same name, released to coincide with the film's release on DVD.

Plot

Cast
C/J Haley as Neil Trembley: An office worker who is just coming out of a long-term relationship. His roommates are Mat and Erik.
Rick Desilets as Matthias "Mat" Highland: An argumentative couch-potato. His roommates are Neil and Erik, and he is an antagonist of Neil's girlfriend Lisa.
John Selig as Erik Goulding: A conflict-averse internet addict. His roommates are Neil and Mat, and he has a good relationship with Lisa.
Rebecca Davis as Lisa: Neil's ex-girlfriend.
Sarah Neslusan as Shannon: One of Neil's friends, and girlfriend of Skott. She has a poor relationship with Mat.
Matt Heron Duranti as Skott: A friend of Neil, Mat, and Erik, who is dating Shannon.

The cast also includes Sammi Lappin as "Abby", a random passerby hired to pretend to be Neil's new girlfriend; Hunter Giles as Homeless Al, a hobo hired to do the same thing for Lisa; and Jeffrey Desautels as Bruce, one of Lisa's coworkers. Director Alex Laferriere and producer Nick Allain have a brief cameo as Neil's boss and boss's underling, respectively. Assistant producer Steve DiTullio also appears in the film as Nelsin, a passerby with the ability to turn his surroundings into a kung-fu movie.

Production

In December 2007, Worcester Polytechnic Institute's sketch comedy troupe Kilroy Sketch Comedy put on a show called Sofa King Kilroy. The show's "omniscript", written by Kilroy member Caleb Wrobel with edits and continuity added by Alex Laferriere, focused on roommates Neil, Mat, and Erik as they dealt with Neil's ex-girlfriend Lisa trying to break into the apartment. The show became a 17-minute stageplay broken up by television sketches, in a similar style to that of the film. Several Kilroy members would eventually work on Something Remote.

Auditions were held on June 3, 2008. Neslusan was the first actor to audition at the casting call, and the role of Shannon (and a substantial portion of the full script) was written into the film specifically for her after her audition for the part of Lisa. At the first readthrough, the original cast saw George Aldrich as Neil, Rick Desilets reprising the role of Mat, John Selig as Erik, Rebecca Davis as Lisa, Sarah Neslusan as Shannon, Matt Heron Duranti as Skott, Sean Cusick as Homeless Al, and Jeffrey Desautels as Bruce. At the time, no one had been cast as "Abby". Aldrich dropped out of the project, and was replaced on the first day of filming by Chris Haley. Sean Cusick also dropped out, and was replaced by Hunter Giles, and Sammi Lappin was cast as "Abby".

Filming began on July 1, 2008, in Laferriere's apartment in Worcester, Massachusetts. Laferriere and his roommates Neal Humphrey, Matt Lowe, and Eric Kolodziecjzak (the namesakes and inspirations for the characters of Neil, Mat, and Erik) lived with a fully equipped set in their living room for 40 days while the movie was shot. The portion of the script involving Skott and Shannon (nearly one sixth of the full script) was filmed entirely on one day.

Because of Worcester's inconsistent weather, and to allow for late shoots, posters were used to cover the windows. This was later described as a nod to the movie Clerks, which was a major inspiration for Something Remote. Additionally, to maintain continuity on-set, all of the on-table props were fixed in place with strips of Velcro. While much of the apartment's geography is used accurately in the film, the door used to leave the apartment in the film actually leads to the side of the apartment building, whereas the front door to the building leads to a door near the television.

Filming on-set wrapped on August 10, 2008, ending with the "pie shot" used as a stinger after the film's credits. External shots and sketch filming continued as late as October 26, 2008, the day before several film festival submission deadlines. The final film length came to 92 minutes. While the film was rejected from 13 film festivals, Broken Wall Films held a premiere screening event at the Elm Draught House Cinema on January 9, 2009, primarily to friends and family of the cast and crew.

Laferriere and Selig later re-edited the film, fixing color and audio issues, as well as trimming the film itself to a length of 86 minutes.

Reception
Initial reactions to the film were mixed. While local newspapers had positive reviews, over a dozen film festivals rejected Something Remote. In the summer of 2009, Broken Wall Films began "touring" Something Remote to various colleges. After entering into the Silk City Flick Fest and competing against films with budgets over 1000 times as large, Something Remote was awarded "Best Feature" and "Funniest Flick".

Something Remote: Plus Edit was subsequently shown at Gen Con Indy 2010.

On the 10th anniversary of the film, the original actors, Rick Desilets, John Selig, and C/J Haley, re-released the film on their YouTube channel (both commentated and uncommentated), alongside a blooper reel and a review of the film.

DVD release
The Something Remote film DVD was officially released on September 14, 2009. It also became available via IndieFlix on February 10, 2010.

Web series
In an effort to advertise the film's DVD release, Broken Wall Films produced Something Remote, a weekly web television series of the same name as the feature-length film. The first episode was webcast on June 28, 2009, on Something Remote'''s official site via Viddler, as well as the following day on a dozen online video sharing websites, with new webisodes scheduled every Sunday. The show followed roommates Neil Trembley, Mat Highland, and Erik Goulding as they struggled to live together in peace after their television―the one thing they had in common―was stuck on the Spanish Home Shopping Network.

The series was written and directed by Alex Laferriere and produced by Nick Allain and Steve DiTullio through Broken Wall Films. The Something Remote website also featured an RSS feed for video podcasting purposes. Something Remote: The Complete First Season was released on September 21, 2009.

The web series served as a prequel to the feature-length film, following Neil, Mat, and Erik as their remote control is broken, leaving them stuck on the Spanish Home Shopping Network. While all this is going on, Neil encounters friction, both with his friends Mat and Erik, and with his girlfriend Lisa. The conflict leads to Neil and Lisa breaking up on ambiguous terms, and Neil stealing her oversized remote, leading into the plot of the film.

The series featured C/J Haley, Rick Desilets, John Selig, Matt Heron Duranti, and Sarah Neslusan continuing in their roles as Neil, Mat, Erik, Skott, and Shannon. It also featured Broken Wall Films veteran Dustin Deren as Officer Red, Steve Harwick as Steev (a caricature of himself), and Jim Perry (the owner and operator of the Elm Draught House Cinema) as himself.

In the pilot episode, "Something Broken", Erik challenges Mat and Neil to a blogging competition: the blog with the most views after one year receives $50 from each of the losers. They all accept and begin blogging to win the hundred dollars. In "Something Popping", Erik mentions that someone on his blog claimed that "corn in the microwave is a no-no idea". In "Something Lost in Time", Mat attempts to convince Erik that he has over 50,000 views on his blog, while in fact it had received less than 3,500 on the episode's release. Neil's girlfriend Lisa had begun posting replies on Neil's blog, interacting with Mat and other posters. These interactive blogs were made available on the Something Remote website.Something Remote ran again on EarthsMightiest.com with new content organized and produced by Rick Desilets. Along with the original webisodes, interviews with Laferriere, Allain, DiTullio, Haley, Selig, Duranti, and Neslusan were released, as well as a short titled "Mantequilla Magica" and the theatrical trailer for Command & Conquer 3: The Forgotten''. A preview of the feature-length film was released the week after the series finale.

Episodes

References

External links 
 
 
 Something Remote at IndieFlix

2009 web series debuts
Video podcasts
American comedy web series
2000s YouTube series
Films about television
2000s English-language films